The Cantius Stele is a Roman grave stele in the form of a rectangular aedicula from Noricum, which was created around AD 100.

The uppermost, the tympanum is composed of a triangular gable with a gorgoneion in the centre and two dolphins facing outwards in the spandrels. Underneath this are laurel wreathed medallions containing portraits of Lucius Cantius Secundus and his wife Cantia Bonia, between two twisting columns. Below this, in a similar but centred medallion is an image of their daughter Cantia Boniata, with an image of a boy to the left and of a girl to the right. The lowest section is the inscription, which reads:

Today it is kept in the lapidarium of the archaeological museum at Eggenberg Palace

Bibliography

External links

 The stele on ubi-erat-lupa.org

Archaeological discoveries in Austria
Archaeological discoveries in Europe
Graz
Steles